Njombe Rural District is one of the six districts of the Njombe Region of Tanzania, East Africa. Its administrative seat is Njombe town.

History
Njombe Rural District was formally established when it was gazetted in March 2012. It was created out of the northern part of the old Njombe District that had been in Iringa Region. Western Njombe District became Wanging'ombe District, and south-eastern part became Njombe Urban District.

Economy
Most people are employed in herding and subsistence farming.

Roads are poor.

Administrative subdivisions

Constituencies
For parliamentary elections, Tanzania is divided into constituencies. As of the 2010 elections the area that became Njombe Rural District had one constituency:
 Njombe Kaskazini (Njombe North) Constituency

Divisions
Njombe Rural District is administratively divided into divisions.

Wards
As of 2012, Njombe Rural District was administratively divided into fourteen wards:

 Idamba 
 Igongolo 
 Ikondo 
 Ikuna 
 Kidegembye
 Kitandililo 
 Lupembe
 Mahongole 
 Mfriga 
 Matembwe 
 Matola 
 Mtwango 
 Ninga 
 Utengule

Notes

Districts of Njombe Region